Ecnomiosa is a genus of brachiopods belonging to the family Kingenidae.

The species of this genus are found in New Zealand and Caribbean.

Species:

Ecnomiosa gerda 
Ecnomiosa inexpectata

References

Brachiopod genera